Yo is an interjection meaning "hello" or "hey".

Yo may also refer to:

Arts and entertainment

Music
 Yö, a Finnish rock band
 "Yo (Excuse Me Miss)", a song by Chris Brown
 Yo! MTV Raps, a television show featuring rap music, later renamed as Yo!
 "YO", an instrumental song by Linkin Park from LP Underground 11
 "Yo", a song by Armando Manzanero from the album A Mi Amor Con Mi Amor (1967)
 "Yo", a song by Squarepusher from the album Selection Sixteen (1999)
 Yo (album), an album by Inna
 Yo (Alex Greenwald album)

Other media
 Yo (film), a 2015 Mexican film
 Master Yo, a fictional character from the Disney/Jetix show Yin Yang Yo!

Language
 Yo (Cyrillic) (Ё, ё), a letter of the Russian and other Cyrillic alphabets.
 Yo (kana), the romanisation of the Japanese kana よ and ヨ
 The Spanish first person nominative pronoun (translates as I or me)
 ISO 639-1 code for the Yoruba language, a dialect continuum of western Africa

Other uses
 Yō, a Japanese given name
 YO, the United States Navy hull classification symbol for "fuel oil barge"
 Yo (app), a social application
 YO! Sushi, a chain of sushi restaurants
Special Region of Yogyakarta, Indonesia (ISO 3166-2 code ID-YO)
 YO postcode area, England
 Yo-leven, a roll of 11 in the game of craps
 YO, a strain of potato virus Y
 Yttrium(II) oxide, YO, a dark brown chemical compound
 "years old", an informal abbreviation for a person's age

See also 
 Yoism, an open source religion
 Yo-yo (disambiguation)
 Whyos, slang for mobsters